Plymouth Cricket Club is a cricket club who have three teams playing in the Devon Cricket League, having withdrawn their 4th side in the 2017 season. The first and second teams play at Mount Wise Cricket Ground, formerly used by the United Services Cricket Club and before them The Garrison Cricket Club.

During the COVID-19 pandemic, the ground was used as a vaccination centre.

References

External links 
 Plymouth CC website

Sport in Plymouth, Devon
Cricket in Devon
English club cricket teams